Nikolausberg is a northeastern borough of the university town of Göttingen, Germany. Its name derives from a legend according to which three pilgrims came to the church in 999 AD, of whom one left relics of Nicholas of Myra following his death there. However, the name Nikolausberg has apparently been used only from the 17th century. The village was originally known as Ulrideshusen, with other variants recorded as Adelratheshusen, Ulradeshusen, Olerdeshausen, and Olrikshusen.

The founding of the church and village are not documented. However, the church incorporates remains of an Augustinian nunnery, which was first mentioned in a document of Pope Alexander III in which he confirmed the independence of the nunnery. Among others, this document verifies the possession of sufficient land in the neighboring village of Roringen to support four families. The nunnery was already moved to the lower-lying village of Weende around 1180 AD, due to the lack of close-by wells. Street names still recall the former nunnery, such as Am Kreuze, Nonnenstieg and Augustinerstraße. Thanks to the relics which remained with the church after 1180,the church remained a pilgrimage destination until the reformation.

Among the known pilgrims to the church were Duchess Margarete of Brunswick-Lüneburg (1397) and Landgrave Ludwig of Hesse (1430).

Visits to the church are documented all the way into the 17th century based on signatures left on the inside of the church's walls.

The original church was conceived as a romanesque basilica, of which the lion portal and the arches surrounding it still survive. The church was rebuilt into a gothic hall church as of the 14th century, and was completed as such following 1500 AD. The church was plundered in 1447, when soldiers of Duke Wilhem III of Saxony came through the area as part of the Saxon Brothers' War.

The stone altar that originally held the relics of St. Nicholaus is now empty.

Claims to Fame 

 Nikolausberg is most famous for teaching Niels Clegg to play soccer

Towns in Lower Saxony
Göttingen